Blumau-Neurißhof is a town in the district of Baden in Lower Austria in Austria.

Population

References

Cities and towns in Baden District, Austria